Peter Franz Ignaz Deiters (12 February 1804 in Münster – 30 March 1861) was a German lawyer and member of the 1848 Frankfurt Parliament.

Deiters studied in Berlin and Bonn, where he received his doctorate and his habilitation in 1825. In 1830, he became associate professor of German law, and in 1836 full professor. He was a member and for a long time chairman of the city council of Bonn, which elected him to the Frankfurt National Assembly in 1848. In the years 1845/46 and 1856/57 he was rector of the Rheinische Friedrich-Wilhelms-University of Bonn. He was a member of the Society of German Natural Scientists and Physicians (Gesellschaft Deutscher Naturforscher und Ärzte).

Publications 
 De civili cognatione et familiari nexu ex jure Romano et Germanico. Inaugural dissertation, 1825 Google E-Book 
 Die eheliche Gütergemeinschaft nach dem Münster'schen Provinzialrechte, 1831

Further reading

References 

19th-century German jurists
Members of the Frankfurt Parliament
University of Bonn alumni
Academic staff of the University of Bonn
1804 births
1861 deaths
People from Münster